Denmark competed at the 2022 Winter Olympics in Beijing, China, from 4 to 20 February 2022.

With the debut of both the men's and women's ice hockey teams, guarantees the largest delegation Denmark ever sent to the Winter Games, and more than 3 times the size of the previous largest delegation, which was 18 in 2010.

On 20 January 2022, it was announced the Danish team would consist of 62 athletes (33 men and 29 women) competing in five sports. Curler Madeleine Dupont and hockey player Frans Nielsen were also named as the Danish flagbearers during the opening ceremony. Meanwhile speed skater Stefan Due Schmidt was the flagbearer during the closing ceremony.

Their best placement was 7th, in the men's ice hockey tournament.

Competitors
The following is the list of number of competitors participating at the Games per sport/discipline.

Alpine skiing

By meeting the basic qualification standards Denmark qualified one male and one female alpine skier, but declined the female quota.

Biathlon

Based on the IBU Qualifying Points list Denmark qualified one athlete – Ukaleq Slettemark. Slettemark competes for Greenland (a constituent country in the Kingdom of Denmark) in the Biathlon World Cup, but as they don't have a National Olympic Committee, Greenlandic athletes compete at the Olympics for Denmark.

Curling

Summary

Men's tournament

Denmark qualified their men's team (five athletes), by finishing in third in the 2021 Olympic Qualification Event.

Round robin
Denmark had a bye in draws 2, 6 and 10.

Draw 1
Wednesday, 9 February, 20:05

Draw 3
Friday, 11 February, 9:05

Draw 4
Friday, 11 February, 20:05

Draw 5
Saturday, 12 February, 14:05

Draw 7
Sunday, 13 February, 20:05

Draw 8
Monday, 14 February, 14:05

Draw 9
Tuesday, 15 February, 9:05

Draw 11
Wednesday, 16 February, 14:05

Draw 12
Thursday, 17 February, 9:05

Women's tournament

Denmark qualified their women's team (five athletes), by finishing in the top six teams in the 2021 World Women's Curling Championship.

Round robin
Denmark had a bye in draws 3, 7 and 10.

Draw 1
Thursday, 10 February, 9:05

Draw 2
Thursday, 10 February, 20:05

Draw 4
Saturday, 12 February, 9:05

Draw 5
Saturday, 12 February, 20:05

Draw 6
Sunday, 13 February, 14:05

Draw 8
Monday, 14 February, 20:05

Draw 9
Tuesday, 15 February, 14:05

Draw 11
Wednesday, 16 February, 20:05

Draw 12
Thursday, 17 February, 14:05

Ice hockey

Denmark qualified 25 male competitors to the ice hockey tournament.

Summary
Key:
 OT – Overtime
 GWS – Match decided by penalty-shootout

Men's tournament

Denmark men's national ice hockey team qualified by winning the final qualification tournament.

Team roster

Group play

Playoffs

Quarterfinals

Women's tournament

Denmark women's national ice hockey team qualified by winning a final qualification tournament.

Team roster

Group play

Speed skating 

Based on the results from the fall World Cups during the 2021–22 ISU Speed Skating World Cup season, Denmark earned the following start quotas: The country would later be reallocated quota for the men's 5000 metres event.
Men
Distance

Mass start

Non-competing sports

Cross-country skiing

By meeting the basic qualification standards, Denmark qualified at least one male cross-country skier, however an athlete was not named to the team.

References

Nations at the 2022 Winter Olympics
2022
Winter Olympics